Padanaram  is a coastal village in South Dartmouth, Massachusetts, United States. The village is located on Buzzards Bay, more specifically near the inlet of Apponagansett Bay.

History

The village of Padanaram was one of many settlements that began cropping up within the town of Old Dartmouth after its purchase from the Wampanoag by members of the Plymouth Colony in 1652. During King Philip's War, English colonists residing in the area took shelter at Russell Garrison. Remains of the settlement can still be seen at the foot of Lucy Street. 

In the mid-18th century it became a shipbuilding center.  In September 1778, during the American Revolution, the British attacked nearby New Bedford with a small force attacking Padanaram. The town prospered as a minor whaling port and was home to a large salt works during the 19th century.  As these industries died out, "the village" (as it is referred to by locals) became mostly a residential area with several yachting businesses, galleries, eateries, and shops.

The town is also the location of the Southworth Library, which was built in the late 1880's, and early 1890's.

Name etymology
The name “Padanaram” came from a prominent early resident named Laban Thatcher, who identified with the Biblical figure Laban, who resided in Paddan Aram in Mesopotamia. The village eventually adopted this new name, and dropped its earlier Wampanoag name, “Ponagansett.”

New Bedford Yacht Club
The New Bedford Yacht Club, while founded in New Bedford, is now located in Padanaram. The club originally founded their headquarters on nearby Fish Island in 1877. Two years later, in 1879 in order to accommodate its growing membership, the club headquarters were moved to the larger neighboring Pope Island. In 1901, the club built the station in Padanaram. It replaced the Pope Island station as the main station of the club following the 1941 sale of the island. The New Bedford Yacht Club bi-annually hosts the Buzzards Bay Regatta.

See also

National Register of Historic Places listings in Bristol County, Massachusetts

References

Historic districts in Bristol County, Massachusetts
Villages in Bristol County, Massachusetts
Dartmouth, Massachusetts
Providence metropolitan area
Villages in Massachusetts
National Register of Historic Places in Bristol County, Massachusetts
Historic districts on the National Register of Historic Places in Massachusetts